The Rubik's Triamid is a mechanical puzzle invented by Ernő Rubik and released in 1991 by Matchbox.

The puzzle is similar to the Rubik's Cube in that the objective is to manipulate the puzzle until all sides are uniform in colour. The puzzle itself forms a triangular pyramid, so that there are four sides and colours.

Rules
Unlike the Cube, the Triamid is easy to disassemble as it is made of ten individual pieces (each with four coloured sides) and four joining sections.  Following the rules, to solve the puzzle the user must remove a small pyramid (of four pieces) from any of the four end points, rotate it, and reattach it.

The puzzle is superficially similar to the Pyraminx but, unlike that puzzle, it is possible to move pieces between a side and a corner position.

Pieces
Each piece of the puzzle has four faces. Of the ten pieces:
 six pieces have two colours, and
 four pieces have three colours (that is, they have only one colour repeated).
In the solved state, the four pieces with three colours must lie on the end points of the pyramid.

External links
 Jaap's Puzzle page

Combination puzzles
Educational toys
Hungarian inventions
Mechanical puzzles